Doc's Island is an adventure module published in 1983 for the Advanced Dungeons & Dragons fantasy role-playing game.

Plot summary
Doc's Island is an adventure in which the player characters must deliver the Egg of the Phoenix to the unusual Doc's Island.

Publication history
R-4 Doc's Island was written by Frank Mentzer, with art by Bob Walters, and published by TSR/RPGA in 1983 as a 16-page booklet with an outer folder. The module was a limited edition, sold only to members of the RPGA. It was later rewritten, and collected with the other modules from the R-series in I12 Egg of the Phoenix.

Reception

References

Dungeons & Dragons modules
Role-playing game supplements introduced in 1983